Rob Harrison may refer to:

Rob Harrison (runner) (born 1959), English middle-distance runner
Rob Harrison (motorcycle racer), see 1950 Grand Prix motorcycle racing season
Rob Harrison (American football), see 1987 Los Angeles Raiders season

See also
Robbie Harrison, Canadian politician
Robert Harrison (disambiguation)
Robin Harrison